Sattar Memon (born 1947) is an Indian doctor and author. He has been an Associate Professor of Medicine emeritus at Brown University in Providence, Rhode Island, US since 1996 and holds M.D. and F.A.C.P. degrees. He has published five books. The film rights were acquired in 2008 for his first novel, The Ashram.

Published works
Providence Journal Newspaper - Magazine Section - Fiction Manohar He had made it in America. Then this immigrant from India got a letter from a childhood friend. (1987)  
The Ashram (2005)  
Jews, Christians, Hindus, And Muslims- Tell Them The Truth: There Are No Angels. . .No Miracles. And...There Is No God! (2007) An anthology of spiritually based short stories tales of faith. 
Breast Cancer Breakthroughs: Living Longer (2010)  
Curing Breast Cancer Blues: 150 Latest & Illustrated Questions & Answers (2012)
Send Me An Angel: Overcoming Cancer with Faith, Medicine & Miracles (2012)

Personal life and philanthropy
The proceeds from the sale of Breast Cancer Breakthroughs were divided among three charities - Gloria Gemma Breast Cancer Foundation, Crossroads Homeless Shelter, and Providence Public Library

Awards
Award for outstanding services as Rhode Island Cancer Society's Division's Crusade leader.
The Ashram (Spiritual Hermitage, in Sanskrit), won a top award in the Inspirational Category of the 13th Annual Writer's Digest International Self-Published Book Awards (2005).

External links
  Sattar Memon's Amazon author page
The Doctor is in:Interview with Sattar Memon, Author of The Ashram
Indomitable hope - let's drink to it from time to time

Notes

1947 births
Living people
Brown University faculty